Trigonopterus arjunensis is a species of flightless weevil in the genus Trigonopterus from Indonesia.

Etymology
The species' name is derived from that of the type locality, Mount Arjuno.

Description
Individuals measure around 3.09–3.34 mm long.  General coloration is black with rust-colored legs and antennae, except for the tarsi, which are also black.  The species exhibits sexual dimorphism, with females being slenderer than males.

Range

Phylogeny
T. arjunensis is in the T. dimorphus species group.

References

arjunensis
Beetles described in 2014
Beetles of Asia